Heshmat Moayyad (Persian: حشمت موید) was a Persian writer, translator and the founder of University of Chicago's Persian program.

Moayyad was the professor at the Chicago University for more than 40 years. He also translated modern Persian literature into English and German. Moayyad organized major conferences at UChicago on the Indo-Persian poet Amir Khosrow (died 1325) and on the poet Parvin Etesâmi (died 1941), as well as the first academic conference about “The Baha'i  Faith and Islam” in 1984 at McGill University in Montreal.

Life
Heshmat Moayyad was born in Hamadan to a Baháʼí family who had Iranian Jewish origins. He started his education in Tehran. After completing his undergraduate studies in Persian and Arabic Literature at the University of Tehran, he went to Tübingen in 1951 to learn German, and by the end of 1952 was studying Orientalistics and German Literature for the PhD with Hellmut Ritter at the Johann Wolfgang Goethe-Universität Frankfurt am Main.

Moayyad died in Chicago in 2018.

Books
(As Editor)
 Maqāmāt-i Žanda Pīl (Aḥmad-i Ǧām) by Sadīd ad-Dīn Muḥammad Ibn Mūsā Ġaznawī. Bungāh-i Tarjumah va Nashr-i Kitāb, Tehran, 1961.
 Rawz̤at al-rayāḥīn by Darvish Ali Buzjani. Bungāh-i Tarjumah va Nashr-i Kitāb, Tehran, 1966.

(As Author)
 Once a dewdrop : essays on the poetry of Parvin Eʻtesami. Costa Mesa, Calif. : Mazda Publishers, 1994.
 Stories from Iran : a Chicago anthology, 1921-1991. Washington, D.C. : Mage Publishers, 2002.
 The Colossal Elephant and his spiritual feats : Shaykh Ahmad-e Jâm : the life and legend of a popular Sufi saint of 12th century Iran. Costa Mesa, Calif : Mazda Publishers, 2004 
  Necklace of the Pleiades: 24 Essays on Persian Literature, Culture and Religion. Leiden University Press, 2010.

References

External links
Dr Heshmat Moayyad reading Farokhi Sistani (Video)
In Memoriam: Heshmat Moayyad, 1927-2018 (by Prof. Franklin Lewis)

People from Tehran
2018 deaths
Iranian expatriates in Germany
University of Chicago faculty
Translators from Persian
Goethe University Frankfurt alumni
University of Tehran alumni
Exiles of the Iranian Revolution in the United States
20th-century Iranian people
21st-century Iranian people
20th-century Iranian writers
21st-century Iranian writers